is a passenger railway station in the city of  Kisarazu, Chiba Prefecture, Japan, operated by the East Japan Railway Company (JR East).

Lines
Gion Station is a station on the Kururi Line, and is located 2.6 km from the terminus of the line at Kisarazu Station.

Station layout
Gion Station has a single side platform serving bidirectional traffic. The platform is short, and can only handle trains with a length of five carriages or less. The station is unattended.

Platform

History
Gion Station was opened on March 1, 1961. The station was absorbed into the JR East network upon the privatization of the Japan National Railways (JNR) on April 1, 1987.

Passenger statistics
In fiscal 2006, the station was used by an average of 319 passengers daily.

Surrounding area
 
 
 Kisarazu Municipal Baseball Stadium

See also
 List of railway stations in Japan

References

External links

 JR East Station information 

Kururi Line
Stations of East Japan Railway Company
Railway stations in Chiba Prefecture
Railway stations in Japan opened in 1961
Kisarazu